Habay is a municipality of Wallonia located in the province of Luxembourg, Belgium. 

On 1 January 2007 the municipality, which covers 103.64 km2, had 7,903 inhabitants, giving a population density of 76.3 inhabitants per km2.

The municipality consists of the following districts: Anlier, Habay-la-Neuve (seat of municipal council), Habay-la-Vieille, Hachy, Houdemont, and Rulles. Other population centers include: Harinsart, Marbehan, Nantimont, and Orsainfaing.

See also
 List of protected heritage sites in Habay

References

External links
 

 
Municipalities of Luxembourg (Belgium)